Tim Mayotte was the defending champion but lost in the final 7–6, 6–1, 6–3 against Boris Becker.

Seeds
All sixteen seeds received a bye to the second round.

Draw

Key

Finals

Top half

Section 1

Section 2

Bottom half

Section 3

Section 4

References
 1989 Ebel U.S. Pro Indoor Draw

U.S. Pro Indoor
1989 Grand Prix (tennis)